Luis Alfonso Ureta Medina (born 8 March 1999) is a Chilean footballer who plays as a goalkeeper for Chilean Primera División side O'Higgins.

International career
Ureta represented Chile U20 at the 2019 South American U-20 Championship, making four appearances and Chile U23 at the 2019 Maurice Revello Tournament, making two apeearances. In addition, he was in the Chile U17 squad for the 2015 South American U-17 Championship and the 2015 FIFA U-17 World Cup and in the Chile U23 squad for the 2020 CONMEBOL Pre-Olympic Tournament.

With Chile U20, Ureta won the gold medal in the 2018 South American Games.

At senior level, he took part of a training microcycle of the Chile senior team in September 2020.

Career statistics

Club

Notes

Honours
Chile U20
 South American Games Gold medal: 2018

References

External links
 
 
 Luis Ureta at playmakerstats.com (English version of ceroacero.es)

1999 births
Living people
People from Rengo
Chilean footballers
Chile youth international footballers
Chile under-20 international footballers
Association football goalkeepers
O'Higgins F.C. footballers
San Marcos de Arica footballers
Chilean Primera División players
Primera B de Chile players
South American Games gold medalists for Chile
South American Games medalists in football
Competitors at the 2018 South American Games
21st-century Chilean people